Bossiaea divaricata is a species of flowering plant in the family Fabaceae and is endemic to the southwest of Western Australia. It is a low, dense, openly-branched shrub with oblong to egg-shaped leaves and deep yellow and dark red flowers.

Description
The edges of the leaves curve downwards and the lower surface is hairy.

Taxonomy and naming
Bossiaea divaricata was first formally described in 1853 by Nikolai Turczaninow in the Bulletin de la Société Impériale des Naturalistes de Moscou. The specific epithet (divaricata) means "widely spreading", referring to the branching habit.

Distribution and habitat
This bossiaea grows in mallee and woodland in disturbed sites in the Avon Wheatbelt, Esperance Plains and Mallee biogeographic regions of south-western Western Australia.

Conservation status
Bossiaea divaricata is classified as "Priority Four" by the Government of Western Australia Department of Parks and Wildlife, meaning that is rare or near threatened.

References

divaricata
Eudicots of Western Australia
Plants described in 1853
Taxa named by Nikolai Turczaninow